Sir Dar (also Romanized as Sīr Dar) is a village in Khondab Rural District, in the Central District of Khondab County, Markazi Province, Iran. At the 2006 census, its population was 158, in 33 families.

References 

Populated places in Khondab County